Deppea splendens (syn. Csapodya splendens), the golden fuchsia, is a species of flowering plant in the family Rubiaceae.

It has been extinct in the wild since its habitat was cleared for farmland. It was once native to Chiapas, Mexico, but is now found solely in horticulture.

Dennis Breedlove, the discoverer, returned to California with some Csapodya splendens seeds in 1981. It is now grown in the San Francisco Conservatory of flowers inside the Highland Tropics gallery and some samples are being grown in the Huntington Gardens, in Southern California .

References

Hamelieae